New Rules (stylized as NEW RULES) is the fourth extended play by South Korean girl group Weki Meki. It was released on October 8, 2020, by Fantagio Music and distributed by Kakao M. It consists of five tracks, including the title track "Cool" and its English version "100 Facts".

Release 
The EP was released on October 8, 2020, through several music portals, including MelOn, Spotify and Apple Music. Music video for the title track was released on the same day.

Commercial performance 
The EP debuted and peaked at number 13 on the Gaon Album Chart for the week ending October 11, 2020, and placed within the Top 100 for five consecutive weeks.

New Rules was the 34th best-selling album in October 2020 with 9,421 copies sold. It has sold 12,207 copies as of November 2020.

Track listing

Charts

References 

2020 EPs
Dance-pop EPs
Hip hop EPs
Weki Meki EPs